Big Bay State Park is a state park of Wisconsin, United States, on Madeline Island, the largest of 22 Apostle Islands in Lake Superior. The  park has picturesque sandstone bluffs and caves and a  sand beach. It encloses unique habitat types including lakeside dunes, sphagnum bogs, and old-growth forest. Bald eagles return annually to the park to nest and rear offspring.

The park is open year-round, though winter visitation is mostly limited to hunters, snowshoers, and cross-country skiers.

All vehicles are required to purchase an admission pass, though pedestrians and bicyclists may enter free.

References

External links
Big Bay State Park official website

Apostle Islands
IUCN Category III
Protected areas established in 1963
Protected areas of Ashland County, Wisconsin
State parks of Wisconsin
1963 establishments in Wisconsin